= Thekkumbhagom =

- village
- Location in Kerala, India Thekkumbhagom (India)
- Coordinates: 10.119°N 76.418°E
- Country: India
- State: Kerala
- District: Ernakulam

Population (2011)
  - Total: 10,798

Languages
  - Official: Malayalam, English
- Time zone: UTC+5:30 (IST)

Thekkumbhagom is a village in Ernakulam district in the Indian state of Kerala.

== Demographics ==
As of 2011 India census, Thekkumbhagom had a population of 10798 with 5400 males and 5398 females.
